The 2018 Virsligas Winter Cup is the league cup's sixth season. It began on 9 March 2018.

Quarterfinals

5 – 8 places
Semifinals

Seventh place

Fifth place

Semifinals

Third place

Final

References

Virsligas Winter Cup
Virsligas Winter Cup